Andrzej Franciszek Zieliński (20 August 1936 – 8 December 2021) was a Polish athlete who mainly competed in the 100 metres.

Career
Zieliński was born in Warsaw, Poland, on 20 August 1936. He competed for Poland in the 4 x 100 metre relay at the 1964 Summer Olympics held in Tokyo, Japan, where he won the silver medal with his teammates Wiesław Maniak, Marian Foik and Marian Dudziak. Zieliński died on 8 December 2021, at the age of 85.

References

External links
 

1936 births
2021 deaths
Polish male sprinters
Athletes (track and field) at the 1964 Summer Olympics
Olympic silver medalists for Poland
Olympic athletes of Poland
Athletes from Warsaw
European Athletics Championships medalists
Medalists at the 1964 Summer Olympics
Olympic silver medalists in athletics (track and field)
20th-century Polish people